Abhimanyu is a 1989 Indian Hindi-language action drama film directed by Tony Juneja. The film stars Anil Kapoor, Kimi Katkar, Poonam Dhillon and Anita Raj. It is a remake of the 1982 Tamil film Sakalakala Vallavan. It was flop despite being satisfactory opening.

Cast 
 Anil Kapoor as Manu / Abhimanyu America Puri / Abdul Jabbar
 Poonam Dhillon as Tulsi / Miss California 'Kelly'
 Kimi Katkar as Geeta
 Anita Raj as Lalita
 Aruna Irani as Parvati (Ram's wife)
 Prem Chopra as Ram Babu
 Shakti Kapoor as Pannalal 'Panni' Double Horse Power
 Shafi Inamdar aa G.S. Parmeswaran
 Jagdeep as Pyarelal / Jack
 A.K. Hangal as Shyam Lal
 Guddi Maruti as Baby (Geeta's Friend)

Music 
"CHandni Raat Hai" - Anuradha Paudwal, Amit Kumar
"Kangna Khanke" - Anwar, Munmi Borah
"Fire Brigade" - Alka Yagnik, Amit Kumar
"I Am The Best" - Alka Yagnik, Amit Kumar
"Phate Na Meri Dosti" - Shabbir Kumar
"Puarana Mera Khunta" - Alka Yagnik

References

External links 
 

1989 films
1980s Hindi-language films
Hindi remakes of Tamil films
Films scored by Anu Malik